Zhenjin (1243 – 1285 or January 5, 1286), also rendered as Jingim, Chinkim, or Chingkim, was a crown prince of the Yuan dynasty of China. He was the son of Kublai Khan and grandson of Tolui.

Life 
He was born as second son to Kublai Khan and first to Chabi Khatun. The Chinese Zen Buddhist monk Haiyun gave him the name Zhenjin ("True Gold") when he was born in 1243. He was created Prince of Yan (燕王), became the head of the Central Secretariat (Zhongshu Sheng) by his father in 1262, and was designated as the Crown Prince (皇太子) of the Yuan dynasty by Kublai Khan in 1273.

He was known as a strong supporter of Confucianism, having been tutored by Han scholars such as Yao Shu (1203–1280), Dou Mo (1196–1280), Liu Bingzhong (1216–1274) and Wang Xun. Among others, he was noted to have studied Classic of Poetry and Classic of Filial Piety. After death of Zhenjin's rival Ahmad Fanakati (according to Rashidaddin, as a result of plot by Zhenjin), a Confucian-trained official in the South even proposed Kublai to abdicate in favor of Zhenjin in 1285, as a result Kublai was furious. He was also known to be a friend of Drogön Chögyal Phagpa, who wrote the famous treatise "Explanation of the knowable" for Zhenjin.

According to the History of Yuan, he died of alcoholism on 5 January 1286, eight years before his father Kublai Khan. However, it may not have been as simple as merely drinking too much. It also stated that shortly before his death, some ministers of the court wanted to propose that Kublai Khan abdicate his throne to Prince Zhenjin on account of old age and because Zhenjin was highly respected throughout the empire. However, Zhenjin tried to prevent this from happening. Unfortunately, Kublai Khan found out anyway and was furious, which terrified Zhenjin and may have led him to overdrink. Distressed by his death, Kublai Khan made Zhenjin's son Temür the new Crown Prince. He was posthumously renamed as Taizi Mingxiao by Kublai on 25 February 1293. Temür gave him posthumous name Emperor Wenhui Mingxiao (文惠明孝皇帝) and temple name Yuzong on 3 June 1294.

Family
He had a senior wife and a concubine:

 Kökejin — from Khongirad tribe
 Gammala (1263–1302)
 Darmabala (1264–1292)
 Temür Khan (1265–1307)
 Concubine Anchinmishi
 Unknown concubine
 Senior Princess of Qi, Qutadmish — married to Körgüz from Öngüds, son of Ay Buqa, Prince of Zhao (趙王) and Yuelie ( older sister of Zhenjin)
 Grand Princess of Lu, Nangabula — married to Manzitai from Khongirad clan, Prince of Lu
 Princess Budagan — married to Zangpo Pal

Ancestry

In popular culture

 "Prince Chinkin" is a central character in the 1982 American-Italian miniseries Marco Polo, where he was portrayed by actor Junichi Ishida. In this film, he is depicted as suffering from epilepsy.
 "Prince Jingim" is also a main character of the 2014 Netflix original series Marco Polo, where he is portrayed by Remy Hii.

References

Citations

Sources 
 Works cited

 

1243 births
1286 deaths
Yuan dynasty people
Sons of Kublai Khan
Borjigin
13th-century Mongolian people
Heirs apparent who never acceded